Eight Days a Week is a 1998 comedy film written and directed by Michael Davis. The title is taken from the Beatles song of the same name. The film features Dishwalla's 1996 hit "Counting Blue Cars".

Plot
Peter (Joshua Schaefer) is infatuated with his childhood friend and next-door neighbor Erica (Keri Russell). Based on advice from his grandfather, Peter decides to camp on Erica's lawn until she realizes that she loves him. During his summer-long wait, he frequently comments on their neighborhood.

Cast
 Joshua Schaefer as Peter
 Keri Russell as Erica
 R. D. Robb as Matt, Peter's best friend
 Mark Taylor as Peter's father
 Marcia Shapiro as Marge, Peter's mother
 Johnny Green as Nick, Erica's boyfriend
 Buck Kartalian as Nonno, Marge's dad
 Catherine Hicks as Ms. Lewis
 Patrick O'Brien as Erica's father
 Darleen Carr as Erica's mother
 Biff Manard as the Sad Man
 Annie O'Donnell as Sad Man's Wife
 Ernestine Mercer as Crazy Lady
 Bill Hollis as Mr. Hatfield
 Jean Pflieger as Ms. McCoy
 Hunter Phoenix as Angela Hamilton

Reception 
On Rotten Tomatoes the film has an approval rating of 22% base on reviews from 9 critics.

Emanuel Levy wrote: "A highlight of 1997 Slamdance Film Fest, this raunchy romantic comedy has a nice premise--a Romeo who won't take no as an answer--but no narrative or plot to speak of, though two leads are charming and Keri Russell shows potential to become a star." He gave it a grade C.

David Cornelius of DVDTalk.com called it "Clumsy but delightful" and gave it 3 out of 5.

References

External links 
 

1998 films
1998 romantic comedy films
American romantic comedy films
Films directed by Michael Davis
1990s English-language films
1990s American films